Zulfahmi bin Awang (born 26 January 1993) is a Malaysian footballer who plays as a striker for Malaysia Super League side Felda United.

Club career

Kelantan
In January 2018, Amirul Shafik signed a two-year contract with Malaysia Super League side Kelantan.

References

1993 births
People from Kelantan
Living people
Kelantan FA players
Felda United F.C. players
Malaysian footballers
Association football defenders
Malaysia Premier League players
Malaysia Super League players
Malaysian people of Malay descent